Henry Clyde Pollock (15 May 1897 – 8 March 1965) was an Australian rules footballer who played with Richmond in the Victorian Football League (VFL).

Family
The son of John Bell Pollock (1860-1911), and Isabella Pollock (1859-1935), née Hiddleston, Henry Clyde Pollock was born on 15 May 1897 at Richmond, Victoria.

He married Alice Isabel "Lal" Hardy (1904-1998) in 1927.

Football

Richmond (VFL)
In his seven seasons with Richmond (1920-1926) he played in 91 games with the Second XVIII, kicking 32 goals, and was the team's captain in 1925.

He also played in 16 First XVIII games, kicking 3 goals, as well as one game for a representative VFL team, at Albury,  on 31 July 1926, against a combined team from the Ovens & Murray League.

His last game for Richmond was at centre half-forward for the Second XVIII team that lost the 1926 Semi-Final to South Melbourne, 11.5 (71) to 10.18 (78), on 18 September 1926.

Ulverstone (NWFU)
Replacing Checker Hughes, who had returned to the mainland to coach Richmond, Pollock was appointed captain-coach of the Ulverstone Football Club, in Tasmania's North West Football Union in 1927, during which time he represented Tasmania at the 1927 Melbourne Carnival.

Murtoa (MWFL)
Cleared by Richmond to Murtoa on 25 April 1928, he transferred to the Murtoa Football Club in the Mid-Wimmera Football League. He played with Murtoa for seven seasons (1928-1933, 1935), including the 1932 Dunmunkle Football League premiership side -- 73 games, 30 goals -- was captain-coach for two seasons (1928-1929), and non-playing coach for two seasons (1933, 1935).

Death
He died at Parkville, Victoria on 8 March 1965.

See also
 1927 Melbourne Carnival

Notes

References
 
 Hogan P: The Tigers Of Old, Richmond FC, (Melbourne), 1996. 
 World War One Embarkation Roll: Gunner Henry Clyde Pollock (1018), collection of the Australian War Memorial.
 World War One Nominal Roll: Corporal Henry Clyde Pollock (1018), collection of the Australian War Memorial.
 World War Two Nominal Roll: Warrant Officer Class 2 Henry Clyde Pollock (V360170), Department of Veterans' Affairs.
 B884, V360170: World War Two Service Record: Warrant Officer Class 2 Henry Clyde Pollock (V360170), National Archives of Australia.

External links 

1897 births
1965 deaths
Australian rules footballers from Victoria (Australia)
Richmond Football Club players
Ulverstone Football Club players
Murtoa Football Club players